Wlpan  is the name of an intensive Welsh course for beginners used by some Welsh for Adults courses in Wales. On the course, basic patterns are taught in as short a time as possible.

The first Wlpan course was organized by the Extramural Department of the University of Aberystwyth over a period of 6 weeks in the early summer of 1973, having been organised by Chris Rees.

The Wlpan course has its emphasis on the spoken language, and different versions of the course are used in different parts of Wales in order to reflect regional differences in dialect, etc. Further courses are then available to take the learner to a level of fluency in Welsh.

The word Wlpan is derived from the word Ulpan, a Hebrew word meaning "studio" ( ulpan in Hebrew), and used to describe an intensive way of learning that language.

See also
Elwyn Hughes

References

External links 

 Welsh for Adults Centre Cardiff and the Vale of Glamorgan - Full range of Welsh Courses and lessons inc WLPAN
 Wlpan (and other Welsh courses) for Adults in North Wales
 Blended Learning, study the WLPAN online 
 e-Wlpan - Wlpan on-line

University of Wales
Welsh language
Language immersion
1973 establishments in Wales
Celtic language revival